Bantangchong station is a subway station in Yuhua District, Changsha, Hunan, China, operated by the Changsha subway operator Changsha Metro. It opened to the public on June 28, 2020.

Surrounding area
Hunan Forest Botanical Garden

References

Railway stations in Hunan
Railway stations opened in 2020
2020 establishments in China